Gerald Turkewitz (February 25, 1933 – February 24, 2015) was an American psychologist who helped to pioneer the field of developmental psychobiology. He is also recognized for his contributions to child development and the study of human infancy. His influences included Daniel S. Lehrman and T. C. Schneirla, the latter of whom was his Ph.D. advisor at New York University.

References

1933 births
2015 deaths
American developmental psychologists
20th-century American psychologists
Scientists from New York City
Accidental deaths from falls
City College of New York alumni
New York University alumni
Graduate Center, CUNY faculty
Hunter College faculty